The 1949 Macdonald Brier, the Canadian men's national curling championship, was held from March 7 to 11, 1949 at Hamilton Forum in Hamilton, Ontario.

Team Manitoba, who was skipped by Ken Watson captured the Brier Tankard by finishing round robin play unbeaten with a 9-0 record. This was Manitoba's twelfth Brier championship and the sixth time that a team finished the Brier unbeaten. Watson would become the first skip to win the Brier three times as his rink won previously in 1936 and 1942.

This was the first Brier in which two teams (Manitoba and British Columbia) entered the final draw unbeaten and the first Brier since 1936 to feature a "winner take all" match in the round robin to decide the Brier champion.

This was also the fourth Brier in which there were no extra ends.

Event Summary
Both Manitoba and the defending champion British Columbia dominated the 1949 Brier as they were both unbeaten heading into the final draw, which would be a "winner take all" match to decide the Brier.

In the deciding game, BC opened with 3 in the first end, but Manitoba would score 7 in the next five ends to take a 7-3 lead through the halfway point. BC would score 3 in the seventh to cut Manitoba's lead to 7-6, but Manitoba would counter in the next end with 3 of their own to increase the lead to 10-6. The next two ends ended in similar fashion as BC scored 2 in the ninth and Manitoba countering with 2 in the tenth. BC would score 1 in the eleventh end and trailed 12-9 heading into the last end needing a big steal to keep their hopes alive. Manitoba would clinch the Brier with 2 in the final end for a 14-9 victory, securing Watson's place in Brier history as the first skip to win three Briers.

Teams
The teams are listed as follows:

Round robin standings

Round robin results

Draw 1

Draw 2

Draw 3

Draw 4

Draw 5

Draw 6

Draw 7

Draw 8

Draw 9

References 

Macdonald Brier, 1949
Macdonald Brier, 1949
The Brier
Sports competitions in Hamilton, Ontario
Curling in Ontario
Macdonald Brier
Macdonald Brier